Leave Us Kids Alone was a TV series made by Twenty-Twenty Television and distributed by Outright Distribution. It involved 10 one-hour episodes (together with 7 half-hour "up close and personal" shows) and was originally shown on BBC Three in October 2007.

Description 

The series involved 12 opinionated teens who were required to prove that they could successfully run a school without adult teachers. It was seen as a social experiment, as the group of twelve teenagers were expected to act as teachers. It was an aspiration of each member to undertake such a task, but the producers had created a challenge for each 'teacher', one which proved difficult from the start.  The filming took place at Wispers School in Haslemere, Surrey and lasted for 3 weeks.

The show depicted the struggles the teenagers went through to keep their cool teaching a class, and featured clips of the teens living under the same roof. The experiment was structured in a way that forced the new teachers into cooperation with each other, creating a team out of a collection of strangers. Throughout the series, effects of the experiment were shown, and many social issues came into play. Throughout the course of schooling, a professional school inspector was asked to oversee the proceedings, taking note of the teen's progress and ability.

At the conclusion of the programme, the teachers had failed 2 inspections, but seemed to have improved greatly from their previous selves, completing the experiment and bringing the series to a close.

The Teachers:

Tom Aston
Hannah Couchman
Rosanna Eaton
Sam Smithson
Shana Dalley
Jordan Smith
Jenni Pass
Bilal Ayonoate
Frankie Bellingham
Liam Collwick-Jones
Leigh Ellwood
Natasha Brown

References

External links

BBC Television shows
British reality television series
2000s British television series
2007 in British television